Daniel Wermelinger (born 18 March 1971) is a Swiss football referee. 

Born in Aarau, Wermelinger completed his training to referee in the lower Swiss Leagues in 1987. He has been member of the SSV-ASA (Swiss Referee Association) since 2005. The match FC Basel against FC Schaffhausen on 22 July 2006 was his first game as referee in the Swiss Super League. 

He is president of the SR-Union (Swiss Referees Union).

References

1971 births
Living people
Swiss football referees
People from Aarau